Corey Wittenberg Sr. (September 24, 1961 – April 25, 2022) was an American-born Australian professional tennis player.

Wittenberg played college tennis for Texas Christian University and earned All-American honors for doubles in 1983.

At the 1984 Australian Open, Wittenberg won his way through qualifying and faced John Sadri in the first round, losing the match in four sets. He later settled in Australia.

Wittenberg resided in Pymble. He died on April 25, 2022.

References

External links
 
 

1961 births
2022 deaths
American male tennis players
TCU Horned Frogs men's tennis players
American emigrants to Australia